Fanni Kenyeres (born 1 October 1978 in Salgótarján) is a retired Hungarian international handball player and World Championship bronze medalist.

Career

Kenyeres played for several clubs, including Budapest Spartacus SC and Vasas SC before joining Alcoa FKC, where she achieved her biggest successes on club level. In 2002, she failed with the Székesfehérvár-based team in the EHF Cup semifinals yet, but three years later they finally triumphed. In the semifinals they won an epic battle against domestic rivals Ferencvárosi TC with a one-goal aggregate difference (30–31; 29–31), to face another Hungarian team, namely Győri ETO KC in the finals. After a six-goal loss in Győr (27–21), Alcoa made desperate efforts to turn the things around in the rematch. As a result, they won the second leg by nine goals (28–19), that was more than enough to win the cup, first time in the club's history. In 2006 Kenyeres also added a Hungarian cup silver to her medal collection.

On 12 October 2007 she agreed a mutual termination over her contract and stayed away from handball for the rest of the season to concentrate fully on her college studies. She returned into action in the next summer, when, in July 2008 she accepted an offer from CS Tomis Constanţa. However, this spell was cut short, as Kenyeres had many problems in the port city and eventually decided to terminate her contract with immediate effect. She left the club just after two months without playing a single competitive match. Not much later, on 26 August 2008 she signed to Ferencváros. She spent two seasons with Fradi, during which time she has obtained a league and a cup silver. She retired from professional handball in 2010. Prior to her last match, played on 15 May 2010, she was awarded the Zöld Sas Trophy, a prize given by the supporters for the one who contributed the most to the club's success in that year.

Kenyeres was capped 35 times for Hungary, in which she scored 68 goals. She played on two World Championships in 1997 and in 2005, winning a bronze medal in the latter one.

Achievements
Nemzeti Bajnokság I:
Silver Medalist: 2009
Magyar Kupa:
Silver Medalist: 2006, 2010
 EHF Cup:
Winner: 2005
 World Championship:
Bronze Medalist: 2005

References

External links
 Career statistics on Worldhandball.com
 Profile on the official website of the European Handball Federation

1978 births
Living people
People from Salgótarján
Hungarian female handball players
Sportspeople from Nógrád County